Dragsum Tsho (Pagsum Co, literally meaning “three rocks” in Tibetan, is a lake covering 28 square kilometres in Gongbo'gyamda County, Nyingchi of the Tibet Autonomous Region, China, approximately  east of Lhasa. The deepest point of the green lake measures 120 metres. The lake is also known as Gongga Lake.

Climate

Footnotes 

Pagsum Co
Nyingchi